Bill Callahan is a writer/producer for such shows as Spin City, 8 Simple Rules, Oliver Beene, Scrubs and Psych.

Career
Callahan was an executive producer/writer on Scrubs, which entered its ninth season on December 1, 2009. He joined the show in its fourth season as co-executive producer, and was an executive producer for the sixth season, and the first six episodes of the seventh season.  Scrubs is created by Bill Lawrence, who co-created Spin City, which Callahan also worked on, as co-producer/producer/supervising producer. He also was a writer on 8 Simple Rules and Psych, and a producer/writer on Oliver Beene. He is the first cousin of John C. McGinley with whom he worked on Scrubs.

References

External links
 

Living people
Year of birth missing (living people)
American television producers